The Speciálník Codex (CZ-HKm MS II.A.7) is a 15th-century speciálník (i.e. special songbook) originating from a monastery in the region of Prague. Its eclectic mix of Medieval and Renaissance a cappella sacred music is matched only by its brilliant juxtapositions of well-known and obscure pieces and composers.  Containing works for two, three, and four voices, the Codex is one of the oldest surviving collections of Czech Renaissance polyphony, and originated in the Utraquist protestant congregations of around 1500. The manuscript is currently in the Hradec Králové Museum, which acquired it from a Prague antique dealer in 1901.

External links
 A listing of Medieval and Gothic recordings, containing a wealth of historical information on the Speciálník Codex.
 

15th-century manuscripts
Medieval music manuscript sources
Renaissance music
Renaissance music manuscript sources
Czech Renaissance